Epsilon Chamaeleontis, Latinized from ε Chamaeleontis, is a triple star located in the southern circumpolar constellation Chamaeleon. The primary and secondary have apparent magnitudes of 5.33 and 6.02, making them visible to the naked eye.

The primary has a stellar classification of B9 Vn:, indicating that it is a B-type main-sequence star with broad/nebulous absorption lines due to rapid rotation. However, there is uncertainty behind the suffix. It has 2.9 times the mass of the Sun and 2.3 times its solar radius. It is a relatively young star with an age of only 3 million years. Epsilon Chamaeleontis B or HJ 4486B is also a dwarf star of undetermined 'A' spectral type with an effective temperature of about 9600 Kelvin, being based on the lesser apparent visual magnitude of +6.1, and is about 3.0 solar masses.

The binary nature of this system was first observed during February 1836 when Sir John Herschel found it as the close double star, HJ 4486AB.  Observations throughout the 20th Century have been slowly reducing, whose latest separation is 0.364 arcsec in position angle 211°, as determined on date 1997.0905 using CCD speckle interferometry by E.P. Horch et al. (1997). It is a likely binary system, though no formal orbit has yet been determined.

Both stars are members of Scorpius-Centaurus Association or the smaller portion known as the Lower Centaurus Crux subgroup. The double star forms the nucleus of the very young Epsilon Chamaeleontis stellar group, which comprises at least 36 stars. The nebulosity and star formation occurring in this region is currently a very important line of study in the southern hemisphere, whose proximity to the Sun is yielding new astrophysical information. Several papers have been published in the last few years on Lower Centaurus Crux subgroup of stars in the far southern constellations of Musca, Chamaeleon and Octans holding the south celestial pole.

References

Further reading

External links
http://www.alcyone.de/cgi-bin/search.pl?object=HR4583 
http://server3.wikisky.org/starview?object_type=1&object_id=1646
http://simbad.u-strasbg.fr/simbad/sim-basic?Ident=HR+4231&submit=SIMBAD+search

Chamaeleon (constellation)
Chamaeleontis, Epsilon
Chamaeleontis, Epsilon
Lower Centaurus Crux
PD-77 00772
4583
104174
058484
Chamaeleontis, 37
Binary systems
Multiple stars